Gabriel Szerda (born 14 August 1977) is an Australian wrestler. He competed in the men's freestyle 97 kg at the 2000 Summer Olympics.

References

1977 births
Living people
Australian male sport wrestlers
Olympic wrestlers of Australia
Wrestlers at the 2000 Summer Olympics
Sportspeople from Dunajská Streda